The Brest Naval Training Centre (the Centre d'instruction naval de Brest, or CIN) is one of the main training centres for the French Navy.  Housed in the Brest naval base, the CIN is made up of the lycée naval (a lycée that also prepares students to enter France's officer-training schools), the École de maistrance (training future naval non-commissioned officers) and the seamen's training school.

French Navy
Military academies of France